Stereotype is the fifth album of Lebanese-Canadian artist Karl Wolf released on September 2, 2014 after Face Behind the Face (2006), Bite the Bullet (2007), Nightlife (2009) and Finally Free (2012). Musically the album is rooted in 1980s music.

Prior to the release of the album, three singles appearing on the album were released as pre-singles. The first was "Go Your Own Way" featuring Reema Major. It was largely an adaptation of the British-American rock band Fleetwood Mac hit of the same title, but with added lyrics and rearrangement. The music video for the single was filmed in the UAE. Two more singles followed in 2014 prior to the release of the album, namely "Magic Hotel" featuring Timbaland and B K Brasco and "Summertime / Let's Get Rowdy" featuring Fatman Scoop, a summer party song filmed in Beirut, Lebanon, Wolf's homeland.

Track listing

References

2014 albums
Karl Wolf albums